is a Japanese model, actress and entertainer who is represented by the talent agency, Asai Kikaku. She also has a business alliance with LesPros Entertainment.

Filmography

TV series

Films

References

External links
Asaikikaku profile 
LesPros Entertainment profile 
 

Japanese female models
Japanese television personalities
1992 births
Living people
People from Ageo, Saitama